Poet Loss Pequeño Glazier is the creator of books of print poetry, digital poems, theoretical texts, and performance works. Glazier stands among literary figures at the "forefront of the digital poetics movement. A "distinguished writer of electronic poetry as well as a critic", according to N. Katherine Hayles, he is author of Luna Lunera (Night Horn Books, 2020), Anatman, Pumpkin Seed, Algorithm (Salt, 2003), Digital Poetics: the Making of E-Poetries (Alabama, 2002), the  first book-length study of digital poetry, and Small Press (Greenwood, 1992), as well as the major digital works, white faced bromeliads on 20 hectares (1999, 2012), Io Sono at Swoons (2002, 2020), and Territorio Libre (2003-2010). These three works are featured in his digital poetry performance film, Middle Orange | Media Naranja (Buffalo, 2010). His projects also include numerous poems, essays, film, visual art, sound, digital works, and projects for dance, music, installations, and performance. Glazier's poetic vision was the subject of an interview by David Jhave Johnston in 2012. His recent project, Luna Lunera: Poems al-Andalus (Night Horn Books, 2020) is a ten-year project culminating in a collection of print poetry drawn from scores of digital, code, and performance iterations. Luna Lunera is co-presented on the Web as digital poems, solo readings and as dance performances (in video).

Glazier is Professor Emeritus of Media Study, SUNY Buffalo, New York, Director, Electronic Poetry Center (EPC), Director, E-Poetry Festivals, and has served as Artistic Director, Digital Poetry & Dance (UB). He now lives and writes in the Smoky Mountains.

See also
Electronic Poetry Center
Digital Poetry
Electronic literature

References

External links
 E-Poetry Festivals Portal Page
 Slashdot: Review of Anatman, Pumpkin Seed, Algorithm
 Personal Homepage
 Middle Orange | Media Naranja
 Loss Pequeño Glazier by David (Jhave) Johnston
 Luna Lunera Homepage

American male poets
Living people
Year of birth missing (living people)
Electronic literature writers
Electronic literature critics